Cash Money Records is an American record label founded in 1991 by brothers Ronald "Slim" Williams and Bryan "Birdman" Williams. Distributed by Republic Records (formerly known as Universal Republic), the label has been home to a roster of mostly hip hop artists, including Lil Wayne, Drake, and Nicki Minaj. The company is regarded as one of the most successful record labels of the 2000s–2010s.

Artists signed to Cash Money Records have achieved a combined 12 number one albums on the Billboard 200 chart and 8 number one singles on the Billboard Hot 100 chart (Juvenile's "Slow Motion", Lil Wayne's "Lollipop", Jay Sean's "Down" and Drake's "One Dance", "God's Plan", "Nice for What", and "In My Feelings", and Nicki Minaj's "Super Freaky Girl").

The label's name alludes to the Cash Money Brothers, drug kingpin Nino Brown's gang from the 1991 crime film New Jack City.

History

1991–97: Beginnings 

Bryan Williams told some of his close friends the motivation for starting the label:

I was hoping it would get us out of the projects and into a positive way of life. And we wanted to help other people get out of this poverty...

 Kilo G was Cash Money's 1st artist and releases "The Bloody City" which features Ms Tee &  UGK. U.N.L.V came shortly after and released "6th & Baronne", "Uptown 4 Life" & "Mac Melph Calio". They were a group of 3 rappers named Lil Ya, Tec 9, & Yella Boy. They were some of the original bounce rappers that help create a sound in New Orleans along with Mannie Fresh. Along the way he met a lot of influential people on the road with the Hot Boys. Wendy Day negotiated the deal between Cash Money and Universal Music Group's Universal Records (now Republic Records), which became a 70%-30% distribution deal. Later, UMG acquired a portion of Cash Money Records, making it a UMG subsidiary.

Starting in 1996, Cash Money signed a slew of new artists such as B.G., Lil Wayne, &  Juvenile, who already had a buzz in the streets in the mid-1990s. At this time, Turk and another local rapper by the name of Bulletproof (aka Lil Derrick) (Derrick Williams Birdman's nephew) joined the roster. In May 1997, Birdman organized a rap group that included Juvenile, Turk, B.G. and Bulletproof. After his father's death, Lil Wayne joined the group, which became known as the Hot Boys. Shortly before the Hot Boys took off, Bulletproof was voted out the group according to Turk. Lil Derrick still was around (#1 Stunna Video) and was releasing music calling himself Lil Derrick the #2 Stunna. He was later killed in 2002. Cash Money's big break came in 1998 when the Hot Boys, B.G. and Juvenile in particular, caught the attention of Universal Records executives.

1998-2000 Universal Records deal 

Cash Money signed a three-year, $30 million distribution deal with Universal Records in March 1998, under which the Williams brothers were given a $2 million advance each year and a credit of $1.5 million for each of the six artists that they had at the time. After recouping, Universal Records would retain 15% of profits from album sales, while Cash Money retained 85%, as well as 50% of their publishing royalties and ownership of all master recordings.  Dino Delvaille, who orchestrated the deal, later told HitQuarters: "I made certain they retained (the rights) of their work. They deserve it." Cash Money's first success under Universal was Juvenile's November 1998 release, 400 Degreez. The album peaked at number 9 on the Billboard Top 200 and would ultimately go on to sell over five million copies worldwide. The success of 400 Degreez solidified Cash Money as a powerhouse label in the national hip-hop scene. The album featured guest appearances from Cash Money artists Turk, Lil Wayne, B.G., Baby, and Mannie Fresh (both individually and as their groups the Hot Boys and Big Tymers), as well as a guest appearance from Jay-Z, the first time an East Coast rapper collaborated with Cash Money. The appearance helped Cash Money gain more exposure on the East Coast.

After the deal, Cash Money achieved a new level of success. Later albums in 1999 such as the Hot Boys' Guerrilla Warfare, B.G.'s Chopper City in the Ghetto, and Lil Wayne's Tha Block Is Hot also saw great chart success, were all certified Platinum by the RIAA, and furthered the label's reputation. These albums contained major Billboard hits such as Juvenile's "Back That Azz Up" (#19 on the Billboard Hot 100), B.G.'s "Bling Bling" (#36), and the Hot Boys' "I Need a Hot Girl" (#65). All of Cash Money's albums and singles in this period were solely produced by the label's in-house producer, Mannie Fresh. Their A&R at Universal, Dino Delvaille, said:

When they first came into the business, they were very reluctant to make records with other people. They probably felt that people would steal their style or flavor, and I had to work hard to get them to open up to making records with Cam'ron, Puffy, and Clipse, among others.

2000–12: Continued success and various signings 

The label's success continued into the 2000s. Between 2001 and 2003, the label sold 7 million albums. The song "Still Fly" by the Big Tymers was nominated for two Grammy Awards. However, B.G. and Juvenile left the label in 2002, claiming financial mismanagement.  In April 2003, Juvenile returned to the label for a reported $4 million deal, and in return, he signed over the rights to Juve The Great, an album which sold over a million copies and contained the Billboard Hot 100 No. 1 hit "Slow Motion". In 2007, former Hot Boys member Lil Wayne was named president of Cash Money Records and CEO of Young Money Entertainment. Later that year, Lil Wayne stepped down as president to focus on his career, especially Tha Carter III. In 2008, Lil Wayne re-signed with Cash Money, ensuring that his next few albums will be produced by the label.

In September 2008, Cash Money released rocker Kevin Rudolf's smash-hit debut single "Let It Rock" featuring label-mate Lil Wayne. On October 15, 2008, at the MOBO Awards, British R&B singer Jay Sean announced that he had signed with Cash Money Records. In February 2009, the Williams brothers were featured in CNBC's Newbos: The Rise of America's New Black Overclass, a documentary show profiling several black multi-millionaires. In early 2009 former Roc-A-Fella Records artist Freeway signed with the label. On August 16, 2009, Bow Wow announced that he signed with Cash Money Records.

In 2009, they took part in a major label bidding war for Queens native rapper Nicki Minaj. Eventually, they won the bidding war and Nicki Minaj was signed to them exclusively for Young Money. Cash Money Records popularity grew after signing Minaj and Canadian rapper Drake. On August 5, 2010, production group Cool & Dre signed with Cash Money Records. The production group announced the news via Twitter. They are the first in house producer Cash Money has had since Mannie Fresh.

On August 19, 2010, Birdman signed DJ Khaled to the label also signing his label We the Best Music Group as a subsidiary of Cash Money. On February 24, 2012, Cash Money Records signed the nu metal band Limp Bizkit. Wayne said the same day they were close to signing Ashanti.

In 2011, Cash Money Records signed a co-publishing venture with the Atria Publishing Group called Cash Money Content.

2013–present: Rich Gang and dissension 

In February 2013, Birdman released a compilation mixtape with Cash Money and Young Money, entitled Rich Gang: All Stars. Shortly afterwards, he announced a compilation album entitled Rich Gang: Flashy Lifestyle that was due to be released on May 21, 2013—it featured members of Cash Money, Young Money, and various collaborators. The first single from the project, "Tapout" was released on March 19, 2013, and features Lil Wayne, Future, Mack Maine, and Nicki Minaj, with production by 808 Mafia's Southside and TM88. "Fly Rich" featuring Stevie J, Future, Tyga, Meek Mill and Mystikal was also released as a promotional single.

The album's release date was then pushed back to July 23, 2013, while the title was also shortened to just Rich Gang. The album garnered a mixed critical reception and debuted at number 7 on the Billboard 200.

On December 4, 2014, just five days before Tha Carter V was due to be released, Wayne issued a statement saying the album would not be released on its expected release date due to his displeasure with Birdman refusing to release the album, although it had been completed. Wayne also expressed his feelings by stating he felt he and his creative partner were being held "prisoner". Lil Wayne filed a lawsuit. On January 20, 2015, Wayne self-released Sorry 4 the Wait 2, a sequel to his 2011 mixtape, to compensate for the continued delay of Tha Carter V. Upon Sorry for the Wait 2s release, it was noted that Wayne disses Birdman and Cash Money Records several times throughout. Birdman was reported to be upset with this. In late January 2015, Lil Wayne filed a $51 million lawsuit against Birdman and Cash Money over the delay of Tha Carter V.

In January 2015, Wayne stated that when he leaves Cash Money, he would take Drake and Nicki Minaj with him. On June 22, TMZ reported new details on the lawsuit. According to documents filed by Lil Wayne, Birdman and Cash Money have mismanaged Young Money, including Drake and Minaj. The documents allege that Birdman and Cash Money haven't paid people. In June 2015, Wayne joined Jay-Z's Tidal as an artist owner and exclusively released a single on the service titled "Glory." On July 4, 2015, Wayne released Free Weezy Album exclusively through Tidal under Young Money and Republic Records. On July 15, prosecutors allege Birdman and Young Thug conspired to murder Lil Wayne and were involved in the April 26 shooting. On July 16, Birdman filed a $50 million lawsuit against Jay Z's Tidal streaming service over Lil Wayne's Free Weezy Album. The lawsuit claims that Cash Money Records exclusively owns the rights to Lil Wayne's music, although he is now independent and the label no longer owns these rights.

On April 12, 2017, Birdman accepted a plaque in honor of Cash Money Records having sold one billion units. On September 13, 2018, it was announced that Young Money was no longer a joint business venture with Cash Money. Ownership of the imprint was granted entirely to Lil Wayne as part of the legal settlements with Birdman that were finalized.

Artists

Current

Former

Branches

Rich Gang 

Rich Gang is a hip hop collective and side project introduced by Birdman in 2013, initially composed of members from the Cash Money Records roster. The group's debut single, "Tapout" (featuring Future) was released in March 2013. Rappers Young Thug and Rich Homie Quan to were later added to the Rich Gang roster, debuting with guest appearances on the group's 2014 single "Lifestyle". The duo were also the primary artists on Rich Gang Allstars (2013) and Rich Gang: Tha Tour Pt. 1 (2014). Later Rich Gang members were a part of the group despite not being signed to Cash Money as solo artists.

Awards and nominations

BET Awards 

!
|-
| 2015
| rowspan="1"|Rich Gang
| rowspan="1"|Best Group
| rowspan="1" 
|
|-

Production wing 

From its founding until 2005, Mannie Fresh was the well-known production head of all Cash Money releases, as the label's resident producer. The label would be without a proper in-house producer until August 2010, when production duo Cool & Dre signed to the label. Since then, the label has grown its production division by signing more producers.

 The Avengerz
 Bangladesh
 The Beat Bully
 Birdman
 Cool & Dre
 Detail
 DJ Nasty & LVM
 DJ Swamp Izzo
 Dub Tha Prodigy
 D Roc
 Illa Jones
 London on da Track
 Natra Average
 Mr. Beatz
 Superearz (Production team)
 TEAUXNY
 The Olympicks
 RedOne
 The Renegades
 Sap
 Yung Berg
 JAE L.A.
 Sufferryanyt
 calvinisggrank80

Legal issues 

In October 2009, Cash Money Records, Birdman, Lil Wayne and various music distribution outlets were sued for copyright infringement by Thomas Marasciullo, who claims his voice was used without permission. The rappers asked him to record some "Italian-styled spoken word recordings" in 2006. The lyrics were allegedly used on "Respect" and other tracks from the rappers' collaboration album Like Father, Like Son and Birdman's 5 * Stunna.

Discography

Compilation albums

See also 

 Cash Money Millionaires
 List of former Cash Money Records artists
 Young Money Entertainment

References

External links 

 Official site

 
1991 establishments in the United States
American record labels
Companies based in New Orleans
Gangsta rap record labels
American hip hop record labels
Labels distributed by Universal Music Group
Music production companies
Music publishing companies
Pop record labels
Publishing companies established in 1991
Record labels established in 1991
Soul music record labels
Record labels based in Louisiana